KFSW (1650 AM) is a radio station broadcasting a southern gospel format to the Fort Smith, Arkansas, United States, area. The station is licensed to G2 Media Group LLC.

KFSW's signal has one of the largest coverage areas for a Fort Smith AM station, while the broadcast radius from FM translator K254AM (98.7 MHz) reaches as far away from Fort Smith as Spiro and Muldrow in Oklahoma as well as Greenwood and Van Buren in Arkansas.

History

KFSW began as the "expanded band" twin to an existing station on the standard AM band. On March 17, 1997 the Federal Communications Commission (FCC) announced that eighty-eight stations had been given permission to move to newly available "Expanded Band" transmitting frequencies, ranging from 1610 to 1700 kHz, with KWHN, also in Fort Smith, authorized to move from 1320 to 1650 kHz.

On November 10, 1997 the new station on 1650 AM was assigned the call sign KHFS.  The FCC's initial policy was that both the original station and its expanded band counterpart could operate simultaneously for up to five years, after which owners would have to turn in one of the two licenses, depending on whether they preferred the new assignment or elected to remain on the original frequency. However, this deadline has been extended multiple times, and both stations have remained authorized.

In 2000, the stations were acquired by Clear Channel Communications, forerunner to iHeartMedia. On November 22, 2000 the call sign KWHN was transferred from 1320 AM to 1650 AM. (The same day 1320 AM changed its call letters to KYHN). At this time, 1650 AM was simulcasting the 1320 AM programming.

In the spring of 2008, after extensive rain and flooding in western Arkansas, the transmitter site for 1650 AM suffered heavy water damage, and on April 2, 2008 the station filed a 'Notification of Suspension of Operations/Request for Silent STA' with the FCC, stating:

The next day a call letter swap was made, with KWHN moving back to 1320 AM from 1650 AM, and KYHN transferred from 1320 AM to 1650 AM.

In 2010 Capstar TX LLC proposed including the silent KYHN to be one of four stations to be transferred to MMTC (Minority Media and Telecommunications Council) Broadcasting LLC. However, this was in conflict with the FCC's general policy that original AM band stations and their expanded band counterparts had to remain under common ownership. An exception to this policy was approved, on the grounds that "Capstar's donation of the facility to MMTC, which planned to use KYHN to train women and minority group members in broadcasting and broadcast management, advanced the diversity goals set forth in the pending proceeding Promoting Diversification of Ownership in the Broadcasting Services". Since then, the stations on 1320 AM and 1650 AM have had different owners.

MMTC later reported that KYHN had again gone silent on February 18, 2012, "for financial reasons". That same year the station was sold to Ms. Kim Media LLC (Kim Girdner) for $50,000, who in turn transferred the license the next year to G2 Media Group LLC, owned by her husband, Darren F. Girdner, for "assumption of liabilities".

On October 2, 2015, the station call letters were changed from KYHN to KFSW. The station added FM translator K254AM (98.7 MHz) as a repeater in November 2015. On January 1, 2020, the format was changed from contemporary Christian to southern gospel, branded as "The Cross 98.7".

Previous logo

References

External links

Southern Gospel radio stations in the United States
Radio stations established in 2001
2001 establishments in Arkansas
FSW